Kowalów  is a village in the administrative district of Gmina Rzepin, within Słubice County, Lubusz Voivodeship, in western Poland.

The village has a population of 1,000.

History
The oldest surviving document from the village Kowalów 1405, but the village had already been founded in the thirteenth century, as evidenced by the historic church from the late Roman period 1250-1270. The village was the center of an estate owned until 1945 was the family of von Kaphengst-Kohlow.

February 2, 1945 the village was occupied by Soviet troops, which in April submitted her Polish administration. Existing inhabitants were dispossessed and deported to Germany.

After the introduction of the Poles held here municipality aggregate, while the current evangelical church devoted to the Roman Catholic Church 29 June 1945 year. August 12, 1945  opened a primary school, giving it the name of the German anti-Fascist Fighters  and in 2009 it became the new patron of Janusz Korczak. In 1946 he founded the first Kowalowie County Municipal Cooperative "Peasant Self-Help."

In the years 1945-1954 and 1973-1976 the area was the seat of the municipality Kowalów. In the years 1954-1972 the village was the seat of the National Council district. In the years 1975-1998 the area administratively belonged to the population of Gorzow.

Transport
Road transport

Kowalów is located on two provincial roads: 137 Slubice-Kowalów-Miedzyrzecz-Trzciel and 139 Górzyca-Kowalów-Rzepin-Debrznica.

Rail transport

In Kowalowie is Kowalów station, which is located on the railway line No 273 Nadodrzance connecting Wroclaw Central from the Szczecin Square.

Direct rail connections make it possible to reach all points on the line. Only stop passenger trains REGIO.

Photos

References

Villages in Słubice County